The Gualeguaychú River (Spanish, Río Gualeguaychú) is a river in the province of Entre Ríos, Argentina. It starts in the center-east of the province, within the Colón Department, and flows south, passing by the city of Gualeguaychú and then emptying into the Uruguay River.

References

 CUENCAS HIDRICAS SUPERFICIALES DE LA REPUBLICA ARGENTINA

Rivers of Argentina
Rivers of Entre Ríos Province
Tributaries of the Uruguay River